Thijs Bouma (born 2 April 1992) is a Dutch footballer who plays as a right back.

Club career
Bouma spent three years playing for FC Twente's reserve team before joining VfL Osnabrück on loan at the end of the summer 2012 transfer window. He made his debut for the club the next day, in a 1–0 3. Liga defeat to SV Babelsberg 03, when he replaced Claus Costa at half-time. After spending one season at Jong FC Twente, Bouma was released and signed a one-year deal with Eerste Divisie side Almere City.

In summer 2015 Bouma moved on to De Graafschap, only to suffer a broken calf in pre-season which took him out for a couple of months. He was released by the club a year later.

References

External links

1992 births
Living people
People from Hardenberg
Dutch footballers
Association football fullbacks
FC Twente players
VfL Osnabrück players
Almere City FC players
De Graafschap players
3. Liga players
Eerste Divisie players
Dutch expatriate footballers
Dutch expatriate sportspeople in Germany
Expatriate footballers in Germany
Footballers from Overijssel